The High Point Panthers women's basketball team is the basketball team that represents High Point University in High Point, North Carolina, United States. The school's team currently competes in the Big South Conference. The Panthers are led by head coach Chelsea Banbury, her second season.

History
High Point began play in 1967. They won the 1978 AIAW Division II national championship 92–88 over South Carolina State in overtime. In their time in Division II, they won the Carolinas Conference Tournament in 1976 (24–1 record), 1977 (29–2 record), 1978 (30–8 record), 1979 (33–4 record), 1995 (22–7 record), 1996 (22–7 record), and 1997 (26–6 record). They made the WNIT in 2007, 2012, 2014, and 2019, losing to Charlotte 72–45, NC State 88–78, Bowling Green 72–62, and Ohio 81–74 respectively. At the end of the 2016–17 season, the Panthers have a program record of 772–597. In 2021, the Panthers earned their first appearance in the NCAA tournament by winning the Big South Conference tournament.

Head coach

The Panthers are led by first-year coach Chelsea Banbury, who was hired as the new head coach in May 2019 following DeUnna Hendrix's departure to Miami-Ohio. Banbury spent 11 years on the coaching staff of Florida Gulf Coast, including the past five as the associate head coach. Banbury was a 2008 graduate of FGCU, where she played on the basketball team. She then helped the Eagles to postseason appearances in all 11 of her seasons on the coaching staff, including six NCAA tournaments. In 2021, she took the Panthers to its first ever appearance in the NCAA tournament.

Individual career records

Reference:

Individual single-season records

Individual awards
Big South Player of the Year
Katie O'Dell – 2005–06
Stacia Robertson – 2014–15
Emma Bockrath – 2016–17
Big South Defensive Player of the Year
Cheyenne Parker – 2011–12, 2012–13
Big South Freshman of the Year
Nicki Fontleroy – 2000–01
Mackenzie Maier – 2007–08
Shamia Brown – 2008–09
Kaylah Keys – 2013–14
Big South Coach of the Year
Joe Ellenburg – 2000–01
Tooey Loy – 2004–05
Big South Scholar-Athlete of the Year
Gina Rosser – 2002–03
Leslie Cook – 2005–06, 2006–07
CoSIDA Academic All-American First Team
Leslie Cook – 2006–07

Coaches

Seasons

Postseason Results

NCAA Division I women's tournament
High Point has appeared in the NCAA Division I women's basketball tournament. They have a combined record of 0-1.

NCAA Division II
High Point has appeared in the NCAA Division I women's basketball tournament. They have a combined record 2-1.

Women's National Invitation Tournament
High Point has made the Women's National Invitation Tournament four times. They have a combined record of 0-4.

AIAW
High Point made three appearances in the AIAW National Small College Basketball Championship. They had a record of 6-3. They were champions in 1978.

NAIA
High Point made one appearance in the NAIA Women's Basketball Championships. They had a combined record of 0-1.

References

External links